Riverview, Kentucky, may refer to:

 Russell, Kentucky, in Greenup Co., formerly known as Riverview
 Riverview, McCracken County, Kentucky
 Riverview (Bowling Green, Kentucky), listed on the NRHP in Kentucky

See also
Riverview (disambiguation)